Carson Lake in Ontario, Canada may refer to one of six lakes of that name:

Carson Lake in Algoma District, NTS map sheet 41J02
Carson Lake in Bruce County, NTS map sheet 41A11
Carson Lake in Hastings County, NTS map sheet 31C12
Carson Lake in Parry Sound District, NTS map sheet 41H09
Carson Lake in Renfrew County, NTS map sheet 31F12
Carson Lake in Thunder Bay District, NTS map sheet 52B08

There is also a Little Carson Lake in Parry Sound District, NTS map sheet 41H09.

References
	

Lakes of Ontario